The 2018 Al Habtoor Tennis Challenge was a professional tennis tournament played on outdoor hard courts. It was the twenty-first edition of the tournament and was part of the 2018 ITF Women's Circuit. It took place in Dubai, United Arab Emirates, on 10–16 December 2018.

Singles main draw entrants

Seeds 

 1 Rankings as of 6 December 2018.

Other entrants 
The following players received a wildcard into the singles main draw:
  Dalma Gálfi
  Monika Kilnarová
  Tereza Mihalíková
  Alexandra Panova

The following players received entry using protected rankings:
  Olga Govortsova
  Quirine Lemoine

The following players received entry from the qualifying draw:
  Yuliya Hatouka
  Michaëlla Krajicek
  Raluca Șerban
  Isabella Shinikova

Champions

Singles

 Peng Shuai def.  Viktória Kužmová, 6–3, 6–0

Doubles
 
 Alena Fomina /  Valentina Ivakhnenko def.  Réka Luca Jani /  Cornelia Lister, 7–5, 6–2

External links 
 2018 Al Habtoor Tennis Challenge at ITFtennis.com
 Official website

2018 ITF Women's Circuit
Al Habtoor Tennis Challenge
Al Hab